was a Japanese theoretical physicist and the first Japanese Nobel laureate for his prediction of the pi meson, or pion.

Biography

He was born as Hideki Ogawa in Tokyo and grew up in Kyoto with two older brothers, two older sisters, and two younger brothers. He read the Confucian Doctrine of the Mean, and later Lao-Tzu and Chuang-Tzu. His father, for a time, considered sending him to technical college rather than university since he was "not as outstanding a student as his older brothers". However, when his father broached the idea with his middle school principal, the principal praised his "high potential" in mathematics and offered to adopt Ogawa himself in order to keep him on a scholarly career. At that, his father relented.

Ogawa decided against becoming a mathematician when in high school; his teacher marked his exam answer as incorrect when Ogawa proved a theorem but in a different manner than the teacher expected. He decided against a career in experimental physics in college when he demonstrated clumsiness in glassblowing, a requirement for experiments in spectroscopy.

In 1929, after receiving his degree from Kyoto Imperial University, he stayed on as a lecturer for four years. After graduation, he was interested in theoretical physics, particularly in the theory of elementary particles. In 1932, he married . In accordance with Japanese customs of the time, since he came from a family with many sons but his father-in-law Genyo had none, he was adopted by Genyo and changed his family name from Ogawa to Yukawa. The couple had two sons, Harumi and Takaaki. In 1933 he became an assistant professor at Osaka University, at 26 years old.

In 1935 he published his theory of mesons, which explained the interaction between protons and neutrons, and was a major influence on research into elementary particles. In 1940 he became a professor in Kyoto University. In 1940 he won the Imperial Prize of the Japan Academy, in 1943 the Decoration of Cultural Merit from the Japanese government. In 1949 he became a professor at Columbia University, the same year he received the Nobel Prize in Physics, after the discovery by Cecil Frank Powell, Giuseppe Occhialini and César Lattes of Yukawa's predicted pi meson in 1947. Yukawa also worked on the theory of K-capture, in which a low energy electron is absorbed by the nucleus, after its initial prediction by G. C. Wick.

Yukawa became the first chairman of Yukawa Institute for Theoretical Physics in 1953. He received a Doctorate, honoris causa, from the University of Paris and honorary memberships in the Royal Society, Royal Society of Edinburgh, the Indian Academy of Sciences, the International Academy of Philosophy and Sciences, the United States National Academy of Sciences, the American Academy of Arts and Sciences, the American Philosophical Society, and the Pontificia Academia Scientiarum.

He was an editor of Progress of Theoretical Physics, and published the books Introduction to Quantum Mechanics (1946) and Introduction to the Theory of Elementary Particles (1948).

In 1955, he joined ten other leading scientists and intellectuals in signing the Russell–Einstein Manifesto, calling for nuclear disarmament.

Yukawa retired from Kyoto University in 1970 as a Professor Emeritus. Owing to increasing infirmity, in his final years he appeared in public in a wheelchair. He died at his home in Sakyo-ku, Kyoto, on 8 September 1981 from pneumonia and heart failure, aged 74. His tomb is in Higashiyama-ku, Kyoto.

Solo violinist Diana Yukawa (ダイアナ湯川) is a close relative of Hideki Yukawa.

Recognition

1940 – Imperial Prize of the Japan Academy
1941 – Academic Noma Award
1943 – Order of Culture
1949 – Nobel Prize in Physics
1963 – Elected a Foreign Member Royal Society (ForMemRS)
1964 – Lomonosov Gold Medal
1967 – Pour le Mérite
1967 – Medal of the Pontifical Academy of Sciences
1977 – Grand Cordon of the Order of the Rising Sun
1981 – Junior Second Rank (8 September; posthumous)
There is a street, Route Yukawa, named after Yukawa at CERN, Geneva, Switzerland.

Bibliography
 Profiles of Japanese science and scientists, 1970 – supervisory editor: Hideki Yukawa (1970)
 Creativity and intuition: a physicist looks at East and West by Hideki Yukawa; translated by John Bester (1973)
 Scientific works (1979)
 Tabibito (旅人) – The Traveler by Hideki Yukawa; translated by L. Brown & R. Yoshida (1982),

See also
 Yukawa potential, an approximation for the binding force in an atomic nucleus
 Yukawa interaction
 Progress of Theoretical Physics
 List of Japanese Nobel laureates
 List of Nobel laureates affiliated with Kyoto University
 6913 Yukawa – an asteroid named after Hideki Yukawa

References

External links

 
 
Paper: On the Interaction of Elementary Particles. I – paper for which Yukawa received the Nobel Prize 
 About Hideki Yukawa
 

1907 births
1981 deaths
20th-century Japanese physicists
Academic staff of Osaka University
Academic staff of Kyoto University
Academic staff of the University of Tokyo
Columbia University faculty
Institute for Advanced Study visiting scholars
Kyoto University alumni
Osaka University alumni
Nobel laureates in Physics
Japanese Nobel laureates
Fellows of the Royal Society of Edinburgh
Fellows of the American Physical Society
Foreign associates of the National Academy of Sciences
Foreign Members of the Royal Society
Foreign Members of the USSR Academy of Sciences
Foreign Fellows of the Indian National Science Academy
Recipients of the Order of Culture
Laureates of the Imperial Prize
Recipients of the Lomonosov Gold Medal
Recipients of the Pour le Mérite (civil class)
Theoretical physicists
Particle physicists
Riken personnel
Mukoyōshi
Members of the American Philosophical Society
Presidents of the Physical Society of Japan